The Sheppard and Enoch Pratt Hospital, known to many simply as Sheppard Pratt, is a psychiatric hospital located in Towson, a northern suburb of Baltimore, Maryland. Founded in 1853, it is one of the oldest private psychiatric hospitals in the nation.  Its original buildings, designed by architect Calvert Vaux, and its Gothic gatehouse, built in 1860 to a design by Thomas and James Dixon, were designated a National Historic Landmark in 1971.

History
Founded in 1853 by the Baltimore merchant Moses Sheppard, (1771-1857), with an endowment of $560,000 (~$20 million in 2021) after a visit and inspiration by the well-known mental health rights advocate and social reformer Dorothea Lynde Dix, the hospital was originally called the Sheppard Asylum. Located on the former country estate "Mount Airy Farm" of Baltimore merchant Thomas Poultney, between the old York Road (then the Baltimore and York Turnpike) and (North) Charles Street Avenue, southwest of the suburban/rural Baltimore County seat of then called Towsontown (today's Towson). The original buildings were designed by the famous architect Calvert Vaux and constructed on what had previously been a  farm, which had been purchased in 1858. The cornerstone of the original building was laid in the spring of 1862. Earlier Gatehouse designs in 1860 by Thomas and James Dixon of Baltimore, and with hospital plans furnished by Dr. D.T. Brown of the Bloomingdale Insane Asylum, to be constructed of stone and brick with a frontage of 375 feet.  Originally  accommodating 150 patients, the facility was designed according to the Kirkbride Plan.

Sheppard stipulated that the following conditions were to be imposed for the Asylum:

Courteous treatment and comfort of all patients; that no patient was to be confined below ground; all were to have privacy, sunlight and fresh air; the asylum's purpose was to be curative, combining science and experience for the best possible results; and that only income, not principal would be used to build and operate the asylum.

As a result of these financial restraints, the Asylum did not open until 1891, 34 years after Sheppard's death, and thirty-one after construction had first started. It also left it with financial uncertainty, putting its long-term future in doubt.

The future of the Asylum was greatly enhanced five years later when in 1896, the estate of Baltimore merchant, businessman, banker, steamship line owner and philanthropist,  Enoch Pratt, (1808-1896) bequeathed a substantial amount of his remaining fortune, approx. $2 million (~$63.5 million in 2021), (after founding, constructing and endowing the city's public circulating library system, the first in the country, with the Enoch Pratt Free Library on West Mulberry Street near Cathedral Street in 1882-1886) to complete the construction and expand the asylum as originally planned decades before with the stipulation that the name be changed to "The Sheppard and Enoch Pratt Hospital". Mr. Pratt knew Mr. Sheppard as a fellow merchant on Light Street, several blocks away from his establishment on South Charles Street during his early business career. He also admired and thought well of the original Sheppard Asylum trustees for having tried to maintain faithfulness with Mr. Sheppard's requests and desires that he expressed before his death. After some legal controversy with Pratt family members and the Maryland legal community about the explicit terms of Pratt's will and bequest, the changes and visions were approved and upheld by the Maryland courts.

In 2000, Sheppard Pratt retained the services HDR, Inc. to design a major expansion to the campus, which would be the largest addition to Sheppard Pratt since its inception.

Today the hospital is one of the leading mental health providers in the United States. It has been constantly ranked in the top 10 by U.S. News & World Report.

The Retreat at Sheppard Pratt 
The Retreat consists of a 22-bed unit designed for those seeking a "comprehensive evaluation and intensive treatment" experience in a psychotherapeutic milieu, unencumbered by the payment policies of third parties. The program at the Retreat includes 38 hours of group programming and 6-8 individual sessions with clinicians each week. The Retreat offers an elegantly appointed setting for an intermediate length of stay of several weeks to several months, where all residents stay at least 20 days.

The Retreat offers a multi-disciplinary treatment approach to a variety of psychiatric conditions that can be treated safely and effectively in a voluntary, unlocked environment.  Individualized treatment at The Retreat includes specialized practices such as Dialectical Behavior Therapy  and Transcranial Magnetic Stimulation

See also

List of National Historic Landmarks in Maryland
National Register of Historic Places listings in Baltimore County, Maryland

References

Further reading 
 The Sheppard & Enoch Pratt Hospital, 1853-1970. A History., Bliss Forbush (1971)
 Gatehouse: The Evolution of the Sheppard and Enoch Pratt Hospital, 1853-1986, Bliss Forbush (1986), ISBN B0006ELCV6

External links
Sheppard Pratt website
, including photo in 2000, at Maryland Historical Trust
Sheppard Pratt on Google Street View

Hospital buildings completed in 1860
Hospitals established in 1853
Hospital buildings on the National Register of Historic Places in Maryland
Psychiatric hospitals in Maryland
Hospitals in Baltimore County, Maryland
National Historic Landmarks in Maryland
Baltimore County, Maryland landmarks
Kirkbride Plan hospitals
Towson, Maryland
1853 establishments in Maryland
National Register of Historic Places in Baltimore County, Maryland